In Honduran football, Liga Nacional de Fútbol de Honduras is the top league followed by Liga de Ascenso. This is an incomplete list of current and past clubs.

The list

 Note: E.A.C.I. stands for Empresa Asociativa Campesina de Isletas.

External links
 LaPrensa.hn – Desafíe a Ismael – 12 August 2010 

Honduras
Clubs
Football clubs